Wirreanda is a South Australian indigenous place name meaning "rock wallaby forest". It may refer to:

 Hundred of Wirreanda, Granville County, a cadastral division in South Australia's Far North
 Wirreanda Creek in the localities of Cradock and Kanyaka
 Wirreanda Creek Railway Bridge crossing of Wirreanda Creek in the locality of Hawker
 Wirreanda High School in Morphett Vale, South Australia
 Wirreanda Public School in Medowie, New South Wales
 Dozens of non-notable private estates in South Australia and associated access roads

References